"Groovin" is a single released in 1967 by American rock band the Young Rascals that became a number-one hit and one of the group's signature songs. It has been covered by many artists, including the Young Rascals themselves in other languages. A slightly different version was later released on their third studio album, Groovin'.

Written by group members Felix Cavaliere and Eddie Brigati and with a lead vocal from Cavaliere, it is a slow, relaxed groove, based on Cavaliere's newfound interest in Afro-Cuban music. The instrumentation of the song includes a conga, a Cuban-influenced bass guitar line from session musician Chuck Rainey, and a harmonica part, performed first for the single version by New York session musician Michael Weinstein, and later for the album version by Gene Cornish.

Background
"Groovin was inspired by Cavaliere's then-girlfriend, Adrienne Buccheri. He said of her, "I believe she was divinely sent for the purpose of inspiring my creativity." Lyrically, "Groovin is the evocation of a person in love:
Life would be ecstasy, you and me endlessly ...
Groovin' ... on a Sunday afternoon
Really couldn't get away too soon —

Cavaliere wrote the music for the song, and he and Eddie Brigati collaborated on the lyrics. The basic track was recorded by Cavaliere on vocals and piano, with Dino Danelli playing conga and woodblock and Gene Cornish on tambourine. Background vocals by Eddie and David Brigati were added later. Bass was added by Chuck Rainey, and occasional session musician Michael Weinstein provided the harmonica. The production was supervised by Arif Mardin.

The song is fairly different from the Rascals' white soul origins, enough so that Atlantic Records head Jerry Wexler did not want to release the single. Cavaliere credits disc jockey Murray the K with intervening to encourage Atlantic to release the song: "To tell you the truth, they didn't originally like the record because it had no drum on it...We had just cut it, and [Murray the K] came in the studio to say hello. After he heard the song, he said, 'Man, this is a smash.' So, when he later heard that Atlantic didn't want to put it out, he went to see Jerry Wexler and said, 'Are you crazy? This is a friggin' No. 1 record.' He was right, because it eventually became No. 1 for four straight weeks."

The single became an instant hit in May 1967, spending four nonconsecutive weeks atop the Billboard pop singles chart. The weeks were interrupted by Aretha Franklin's cover of "Respect", which spent two weeks at No. 1 in the middle of "Groovins run. Interestingly, Franklin would later cover "Groovin for her album Lady Soul. The song also reached No. 3 on the Billboard Black Songs chart. "Groovin was the only hit the group ever had in the United Kingdom, reaching No. 8 on the UK Singles Chart. After the fourth week, "Groovin dropped from the charts; Casey Kasem remarked on it in his radio show American Top 40 five years later.

The song was an RIAA-certified gold record on June 13, 1967. Due to its massive popularity, the track was included on the Young Rascals' late July 1967 album of the same name, albeit with an alternate harmonica solo by Cornish on the stereo version.

"Groovin is one of the Rock and Roll Hall of Fame's 500 Songs that Shaped Rock and Roll, and is also the recipient of a Grammy Hall of Fame Award.

The phrase "you and me endlessly" was often misheard as the mondegreen "you and me and Leslie".

Personnel
The Young Rascals
 Felix Cavaliere – lead vocals, piano
 Eddie Brigati – backing vocals
 Gene Cornish – tambourine; harmonica on album version
 Dino Danelli – congas, woodblock

Other personnel
 David Brigati – backing vocals
 Chuck Rainey – bass guitar
 Michael Weinstein – harmonica on single version
 Tom Dowd – engineer

Charts

Weekly charts

Year-end charts

All-time charts

Cover versions
 Within weeks of the Young Rascals release, Booker T. and the M.G.'s recorded an instrumental cover of "Groovin. Issued as a single, the track reached No. 21 on the pop charts, No. 10 on the US R&B charts, and No. 4 on the Canadian R&B chart in the summer of 1967.
 The Young Rascals themselves recorded "Groovin in Spanish, French, and Italian in 1968.
 A cover by War reached No. 30 on the U.S. Billboard Adult Contemporary chart in the spring of 1985 and No. 79 on the Billboard Hot Black Singles chart.
 In 1996, Pato Banton recorded a version with the Reggae Revolution that reached number 14 on the UK Singles Chart in July. The next month, the cover became a major hit in New Zealand, reaching number four on the RIANZ Singles Chart and staying in the top 20 for nine weeks. It was the country's 47th best-selling single of the year and received a Gold sales certification for selling over 5,000 copies.
 It was used as the title track of Bill Wyman's Rhythm Kings 2000 album Groovin'.

References

External links
 

1967 songs
1967 singles
1996 singles
Songs written by Eddie Brigati
Songs written by Felix Cavaliere
The Rascals songs
The Esquires songs
Leif Garrett songs
Billboard Hot 100 number-one singles
Cashbox number-one singles
RPM Top Singles number-one singles
Grammy Hall of Fame Award recipients
Atlantic Records singles
Stax Records singles